R704 road may refer to:
 R704 road (Ireland)
 R704 (South Africa)